Cabo Ruivo is a station on the Red Line of the Lisbon Metro. The station is located on Av. Padua, near the intersection with Av. Infante Dom Henrique serving the Cabo Ruivo area of the city.

History
The design is by architects João Santa-Rita, Jose-Santa Rita, Duarte Nuno Simoes and Nuno Simões, with installation art by the plastic artist David de Almeida.

Connections

Urban buses

Carris 
 750 Estação Oriente (Interface) ⇄ Algés
 782 Cais do Sodré ⇄ Praça José Queirós
 794 Terreiro do Paço ⇄ Estação Oriente (Interface)

See also
 List of Lisbon metro stations

References

External links

Red Line (Lisbon Metro) stations
Railway stations opened in 1998